Viacha is a city in Bolivia, situated in the Ingavi Province in the La Paz Department. Viacha lies in the Altiplano, 22 km southwest of La Paz. Transportation to and from the city includes cars, buses, and a train.

Economy 

Viacha is home to one of the largest cement factories in Bolivia, 'Cemento Viacha,' which is part of SOBOCE . Other sources of income for the city include agriculture, mainly consisting of potatoes.

Culture 
The location of Viacha, which lies close to Lake Titicaca and Tiawanaku, makes it a cultural center for the Irohito-Urus. These descendants of the Incas have lived in this area for hundreds of years.

References 

Populated places in La Paz Department (Bolivia)

it:Viacha